Siphelele Mnyande, known professionally as PdotO, is a South African rapper and songwriter.

Career
He has collaborated with various artists such as L-Tido, Chad Da Don, Reason, J.Smallz and Bongani Fassie.

On 14 July 2017, he released his debut album Devilz Playground which featured vocalists and rappers such as J.Smallz, Kimosabe, Blaklez, Ginger Trill and Maggz.

In 2018, both his acting and musical career further grew when he got a leading role in the State Theatre production, Freedom the Musical which was directed by multi-award winning director, Aubrey Sekhabi. In the same year he released his second album titled, Under the Sun. He was also on the BET Africa Cyphers representing CapCity in 2018.

Discography
Studio albums
Devilz Playground (2017)
Under the Sun (2018)
Cold Waters (2020)
 Cold Waters: Love Eternal (2020)
 Cold Waters: Low Tides and Lost Tapes (2021)

Collaboration albums
 Lost Diamonds  (2020)
Like Water Mixtape (with DJ Switch) (2021)
Matthew 22:14 (with Chad Da Don)(2021)
Lost Diamonds 2 (with Blaklez) (2022)
Psalm 23 (with Chad Da Don)(2022)

Mixtapes
 Street Novelty (2009)
 Blue Murda-PdotO Mixtape (2010)
 Mind over MAtter Lp (2012)
 Son of Nomsa Mixtape (2023)

Filmography

Television

Awards and nominations

References

External links
 

Living people
People from the Eastern Cape
South African rappers
South African hip hop musicians
1985 births